Scout Gillett is an American indie folk musician currently signed to Captured Tracks.

History
Gillett moved from her hometown of Kansas City to Brooklyn in 2017 to pursue a career in music. Upon moving to Brooklyn, Gillett engrossed herself in the music scene, playing in various different bands. In 2022, Gillett moved to a solo career, signing with the Brooklyn based label Captured Tracks. She released an EP that year titled one to ten consisting of one original song and three covers. Later that same year, Gillett announced her debut full-length album. The album, no roof no floor, was released October 28th.

Discography
Studio albums
no roof no floor (2022, Captured Tracks)
EPs
one to ten (2022, Captured Tracks)

References

Living people

Year of birth missing (living people)
Captured Tracks artists
Indie folk musicians
Musicians from Kansas City, Missouri
Musicians from Brooklyn
Folk musicians from Missouri